Friðrik Guðmundsson (born 4 April 1955) is an Icelandic former freestyle swimmer. He competed in two events at the 1972 Summer Olympics.

References

External links
 

1955 births
Living people
Fridrik Gudmundsson
Fridrik Gudmundsson
Swimmers at the 1972 Summer Olympics
Place of birth missing (living people)